Bosniacs may refer to:

 as a spelling variant for Bosniaks, an ethnonym designating ethnic Bosniaks
 as a spelling variant for Bosnians, a demonym designating the general population of Bosnia

See also
 Bosniac (disambiguation)
 Name of Bosnia
 Bosnia (disambiguation)
 Bosnian (disambiguation)
 Bosnians (disambiguation)
 Bosniaks (disambiguation)
 Bosniak (disambiguation)